Mark Clifford Forsythe (born 10 August 1965) is a Northern Irish former athlete who competed in the men's long jump event during his career. He twice represented Great Britain at the Summer Olympics: 1988 and 1992. Forsythe was affiliated with Ballymena & Antrim.

Following his athletics career, Forsythe, who was born in Belfast, worked for BBC Northern Ireland as a presenter and reporter. He went on to join Sky in 1995, and worked for Sky Sports as an executive producer, and later as production workflow manager.

International competitions

 (#) Results in parentheses indicate distance achieved in qualifying round.
 (q) Indicates overall position achieved in qualifying round.

External links
 

1965 births
Living people
Male athletes from Northern Ireland
Long jumpers from Northern Ireland
Athletes (track and field) at the 1988 Summer Olympics
Athletes (track and field) at the 1990 Commonwealth Games
Athletes (track and field) at the 1992 Summer Olympics
Olympic athletes of Great Britain
Commonwealth Games competitors for Northern Ireland
Sportspeople from Belfast
World Athletics Championships athletes for Great Britain